The 2016 Rice Owls football team represented Rice University in the 2016 NCAA Division I FBS football season. The Owls played their home games at Rice Stadium in Houston, Texas, and competed in the West Division of Conference USA (C–USA). They were led by tenth year head coach David Bailiff. They finished the season 3–9, 2–6 in C-USA play to finish in a tie for fifth place in the East Division.

Schedule
Rice announced its 2016 football schedule on February 4, 2016. The 2016 schedule consisted of 6 home and 6 away games in the regular season. The Owls hosted C–USA foes Florida Atlantic, North Texas, UTEP, and UTSA, and traveled to Charlotte, Louisiana Tech, Southern Miss, and Western Kentucky (WKU).

The team played four non–conference games, two home games against Baylor from the Big 12 Conference and Prairie View A&M from the Southwestern Athletic Conference, and two road games against Army, which was independent from a conference, and Stanford from the Pac-12 Conference.

Schedule Source:

Game summaries

WKU

at Army

Baylor

North Texas

at Southern Miss

UTSA

Prairie View A&M

at Louisiana Tech

Florida Atlantic

at Charlotte

UTEP

at Stanford

References

Rice
Rice Owls football seasons
Rice Owls football